The Dyre and Maria Amundsen House, at 307 E. Winchester St. in Murray, Utah, was listed on the National Register of Historic Places in 2015.

Dyre was from Norway.  He built an adobe house, then later a brick one.

References

National Register of Historic Places in Salt Lake County, Utah
Buildings and structures in Murray, Utah
Houses on the National Register of Historic Places in Utah